In mathematics and computing, a triangular array of numbers, polynomials, or the like, is a doubly indexed sequence in which each row is only as long as the row's own index. That is, the ith row contains only i elements.

Examples
Notable particular examples include these:
The Bell triangle, whose numbers count the partitions of a set in which a given element is the largest singleton
 Catalan's triangle, which counts strings of parentheses in which no close parenthesis is unmatched
 Euler's triangle, which counts permutations with a given number of ascents
 Floyd's triangle, whose entries are all of the integers in order
 Hosoya's triangle, based on the Fibonacci numbers
 Lozanić's triangle, used in the mathematics of chemical compounds
 Narayana triangle, counting strings of balanced parentheses with a given number of distinct nestings
 Pascal's triangle, whose entries are the binomial coefficients

Triangular arrays of integers in which each row is symmetric and begins and ends with 1 are sometimes called generalized Pascal triangles; examples include Pascal's triangle, the Narayana numbers, and the triangle of Eulerian numbers.

Generalizations
Triangular arrays may list mathematical values other than numbers; for instance the Bell polynomials form a triangular array in which each array entry is a polynomial.

Arrays in which the length of each row grows as a linear function of the row number (rather than being equal to the row number) have also been considered.

Applications
Apart from the representation of triangular matrices, triangular arrays are used in several algorithms. One example is the CYK algorithm for parsing context-free grammars, an example of dynamic programming.

Romberg's method can be used to estimate the value of a definite integral by completing the values in a triangle of numbers.

The Boustrophedon transform uses a triangular array to transform one integer sequence into another.

See also
 Triangular number, the number of entries in such an array up to some particular row

References

External links